"La complainte de l'heure de pointe (À vélo dans Paris)" is a song by Joe Dassin from his 1972 album Joe.

The song was based on the song "La Di Li La Di Lo" written by Chris Juwens and Leon Deane and originally released by Jeremias. It was adapted into French by Richelle Dassin et Claude Lemesle.

Released in 1973 as a single, in France it was number one on the singles sales chart for one week from February 12 to 18, 1973.

Track listing 
7" single (CBS 1109)
 "La complainte de l'heure de pointe (À vélo dans Paris)" (2:00)
 "Un peu de paradis" (2:18)

Charts

References 

1972 songs
1973 singles
Joe Dassin songs
French songs
CBS Records singles
Number-one singles in France
Song recordings produced by Jacques Plait
Songs written by Claude Lemesle